Imaginary Landscape is the title of a series of five pieces by American composer John Cage, all of which include instruments or other elements requiring electricity. The series comprises the following works:
 Imaginary Landscape No. 1 (1939)
for two variable-speed turntables, frequency recordings, muted piano, and cymbal
 Imaginary Landscape No. 2 (March No. 1) (1942)
for tin cans, conch shell, ratchet, bass drum, buzzers, water gong, metal wastebasket, lion's roar and amplified coil of wire
 Imaginary Landscape No. 3 (1942)
for tin cans, muted gongs, audio frequency oscillators, variable speed turntables with frequency recordings and recordings of generator whines, amplified coil of wire, amplified marimbula (a Caribbean instrument similar to the African thumb piano), and electric buzzer
 Imaginary Landscape No. 4 (March No. 2) (1951)
for 24 performers at 12 radios
 Imaginary Landscape No. 5 (1952)
for magnetic tape recording of any 42 phonograph records

See also
 List of compositions by John Cage

External links
Recording of Imaginary Landscape No. 1 at Media Art Net

Compositions by John Cage
Modernist compositions
Process music pieces